Through the Olive Trees ( Zīr-e Derakhtān-e Zeytūn, actually meaning Under the Olive Trees) is a 1994 Iranian drama film written, produced, edited and directed by Iranian filmmaker Abbas Kiarostami. The final part of Kiarostami's Koker trilogy, the plot, set in earthquake-ravaged Northern Iran, revolves around the production of the second film; And Life Goes On..., which itself was a revisitation of the first film - Where Is the Friend's Home?.

Like much of Kiarostami's work, Through the Olive Trees is filmed in a naturalistic way; a complex study of the link between art and life, its narrative often blurs the boundaries between fiction and reality. The film was selected as the Iranian entry for the Best Foreign Language Film at the 67th Academy Awards, but was not accepted as a nominee. Many have since declared the film a masterpiece.

Plot
Hossein Rezai plays a local stonemason-turned-actor. Outside the set of a film in which he is acting, he makes a marriage proposal to his leading lady, a student named Tahereh, who was orphaned by an earthquake. Because he is poor and illiterate, the girl's family finds his offer insulting; the girl avoids him as a result. She continues evading him even when they are filming, as she seems to have trouble grasping the difference between her role in the film and her real-life self. The fictional couple takes part in what would be the filming of Life, and Nothing More....

The situation complicates further as Hossein still pursues the affections of the young actress while the film goes on. The director learns about this and tries to advise Hossein about what to do. He then illustrates their story and where the conflict began. The girl manages to finish the scene while Hossein woos her and then departs by walking as Hossein runs to follow her.

In the final scene, at a great distance, the girl finally gives an answer to Hossein and we are left with him running through a green field and back into the olive grove. The audience is left to wonder what response was given by the girl.

Reception 
The film was well-received amongst international cinema critics, especially in France, and was nominated for the Palme d'Or at the 1994 Cannes Film Festival. It won the Espiga de Oro at the 1994 Seminci in Valladolid. In particular, its ambiguous final scene has been widely discussed and celebrated.

In the 2012 Sight & Sound poll, six critics and four directors ranked Through the Olive Trees one of the 10 greatest films ever made.

Miramax Films had also acquired the United States distribution rights to Through the Olive Trees and the film was given a limited US theatrical release in 1995. However, Miramax Films never released the film on home video, with the film's only American home video release being a Blu-ray from The Criterion Collection as part of the "Koker Trilogy" boxset.

See also
 List of submissions to the 67th Academy Awards for Best Foreign Language Film
 List of Iranian submissions for the Academy Award for Best Foreign Language Film

References

External links
 
 
 

1994 films
Films directed by Abbas Kiarostami
Iranian drama films
1990s Persian-language films
Films set in Iran
Films about filmmaking
1994 drama films